The NAIA Women's Indoor Track and Field Championship is the annual track meet to determine the national champions of NAIA women's indoor track and field in the United States and Canada. It has been held annually since 1981.

Wayland Baptist have been the most successful program, with eight national title.

The reigning champions are Indiana Tech, who won their third championship in 2022.

Results

Champions

Team titles

 Schools highlight in yellow have reclassified athletics from the NAIA.

See also
NAIA Track and Field
NAIA Women's Outdoor Track and Field Championship
NAIA Men's Indoor Track and Field Championship
NAIA Men's Outdoor Track and Field Championship
NCAA Track and Field
NCAA Women's Indoor Track and Field Championships (Division I, Division II, Division III)
NCAA Women's Outdoor Track and Field Championships (Division I, Division II, Division III)
NCAA Men's Indoor Track and Field Championships (Division I, Division II, Division III)
NCAA Men's Outdoor Track and Field Championships (Division I, Division II, Division III)

References

External links
NAIA Women's Indoor Track and Field

College track and field competitions in the United States
In
NAIA national women's ind
Recurring sporting events established in 1981
1981 establishments in the United States